Libbie Hickman (née Johnson) (born February 17, 1965) is an American former track and field athlete who competed in long-distance running events. Hickman represented the United States at the 2000 Summer Olympics in the 10,000 m.

Hickman is the daughter of an oil company executive and attended high school in Cairo, Egypt.   Hickman and Catherine Ndereba had a memorable race at the 2000 Beach to Beacon race; they both finished in the same time, but Hickman celebrated after crossing the "ceremonial tape".  Ndereba ran the final step to the official finish line and was awarded the win.

References

1965 births
Living people
Sportspeople from Fort Collins, Colorado
Track and field athletes from Colorado
American female long-distance runners
Olympic track and field athletes of the United States
Athletes (track and field) at the 2000 Summer Olympics
Goodwill Games medalists in athletics
Competitors at the 1998 Goodwill Games
Colorado State Rams women's track and field athletes